Tony Cook is a former Cornish rugby union player who played for Hayle RFC, Devon and Cornwall Police RFC, Camborne RFC, Redruth R.F.C. and is the highest capped player to represent Cornwall with a record 102 appearances. He retired as head coach at Hayle RFC in March 2005 after spending eight years at the club.

See also

 Cornish rugby

References

Cornish rugby union players
Living people
Year of birth missing (living people)